Haruna may refer to:

Geography
 Haruna, Gunma, a town in Gunma prefecture, Japan
 Mount Haruna, a dormant volcano in Gunma, eastern Honshu, Japan
 Lake Haruna, a lake on Mount Haruna

Names
Haruna (name), a Japanese feminine given name and a Japanese surname
Haruna, Haroona or Harouna, a Quranic given name common mostly in Africa (for boys) and South Asia (for girls)

Other uses
 , a battleship of the Imperial Japanese Navy
 , a class of destroyers of the Japan Maritime Self-Defense Force

See also
 Harun, Arabic masculine given name